A cumomer is a cumulative isotopomer and is a concept that relates to metabolic flux analysis. The concept was developed in 1999.

Description 
A cumomer is a cumulative isotopomer. The concept relates to metabolic flux analysis.

History
The concept was developed in 1999.

Metabolic flux analysis 
Given a molecule as a set of atoms—any of which could be (isotopically) labeled—the cumomers are a set of isotopomers with particular positions of 13C-labels grouped into different levels depending on the amount of labeled atoms. At level 0, any position can be either 12C or 13C. At level 1, one position is 13C whether the others may or may not be labeled and so on.

References

Further reading 

 

Systems biology